The town of Pauanui (a Māori language name meaning "big pāua (abalone)") is on the east coast of the Coromandel Peninsula in the North Island of New Zealand. It lies at the mouth of the Tairua River on its south bank, directly opposite the larger town of Tairua.

The two settlements are 30 kilometres east of Thames. Several islands lie off the mouth of the river, notably Slipper Island to the southeast and the Aldermen Islands 20 kilometres to the East.

The area is a popular holiday destination, with an estimated summer holiday maker population of over 15,000. Pauanui is known as New Zealand's holiday destination for the elite and wealthy. It is approximately a one-hour 50 minute drive from Auckland - New Zealand's most populous city.

The settlement has an airstrip used by recreational light-aircraft pilots and is noted for game fishing, diving, surfing and its excellent beach.

The area was developed in the late 1960s with a focus on families and included features that were first of their kind in New Zealand, such as red-coloured roads to improve the visibility of pedestrians.

Demographics

Pauanui had a population of 1,005 at the 2018 New Zealand census, an increase of 180 people (21.8%) since the 2013 census, and an increase of 204 people (25.5%) since the 2006 census. There were 501 households, comprising 486 males and 519 females, giving a sex ratio of 0.94 males per female. The median age was 63.1 years (compared with 37.4 years nationally), with 96 people (9.6%) aged under 15 years, 84 (8.4%) aged 15 to 29, 372 (37.0%) aged 30 to 64, and 456 (45.4%) aged 65 or older.

Ethnicities were 94.6% European/Pākehā, 5.7% Māori, 0.6% Pacific peoples, 2.4% Asian, and 2.7% other ethnicities. People may identify with more than one ethnicity.

The percentage of people born overseas was 18.2, compared with 27.1% nationally.

Although some people chose not to answer the census's question about religious affiliation, 48.4% had no religion, 43.0% were Christian, 0.9% were Hindu, 0.3% were Buddhist and 2.1% had other religions.

Of those at least 15 years old, 120 (13.2%) people had a bachelor's or higher degree, and 168 (18.5%) people had no formal qualifications. The median income was $29,700, compared with $31,800 nationally. 138 people (15.2%) earned over $70,000 compared to 17.2% nationally. The employment status of those at least 15 was that 291 (32.0%) people were employed full-time, 135 (14.9%) were part-time, and 3 (0.3%) were unemployed.

References

External links 
 1:50,000 map

Thames-Coromandel District
Populated places in Waikato